William Mortimer (2 April 1874 – 31 October 1916) was an English rugby union forward who played club rugby for Marlborough Nomads and was capped for England, and was part of the British Isles tour to South Africa in 1896.

Early life
Mortimer was born in Warrington, Cheshire in 1874 to William Mortimer of Frodsham. He was educated at Marlborough College before matriculating to Trinity College, Cambridge in 1893. He worked on the London Stock Exchange.

Bibliography

References

1874 births
1916 deaths
Alumni of Trinity College, Cambridge
British & Irish Lions rugby union players from England
Cambridge University R.U.F.C. players
England international rugby union players
English rugby union players
People educated at Marlborough College
Rugby union forwards
Rugby union players from Warrington